Meguetan  is a commune in the Cercle of Koulikoro in the Koulikoro Region of south-western Mali. The principal town lies at Gouni on the Niger River. As of 1998 the commune had a population of 15,136.

References

Communes of Koulikoro Region
Communities on the Niger River